Wildwood Regional Park is a suburban regional park in the western Simi Hills and Conejo Valley, in Ventura County, California. It is located in western Thousand Oaks, northern Newbury Park, and southern Moorpark.

Wildwood is home to over 27 miles of hiking trails. The four principle trails are the Mesa-, Moonridge-, Wildwood Canyon- and Santa Rosa Trails. Over 250 plant species have been recorded in Wildwood, as well as 37 species of mammals, 70 bird species, and 22 species of amphibians and reptiles.

The park is operated by the Conejo Open Space Conservation Agency (COSCA).

History

The area was home to the Chumash people for more than 8,000 years − before it became a part of the Rancho El Conejo Spanish land grant in 1803, during the colonial Alta California era. There are numerous archeological sites. Some of the artifacts discovered here include stone tools, shell beads and arrowheads. A Chumash village known as Yitimasɨh was located where Wildwood Elementary School sits today. Wildflower Cave (Ven-486) is near Mount Clef Ridge and was used for shelter by the Chumash people in pre-colonial times.

Sheep and cattle grazed the area for much of the 19th- and early 20th century. It was also used as a movie ranch (Janss Conejo Ranch) for the Hollywood film industry from the 1930s through the 1960s. Various wild west movies were filmed here. Television series were also filmed here, such as Bonanza, Dodge City, Gunsmoke, The Rifleman, Flaming Star, The Big Valley and Wagon Train. The park is still occasionally utilized as a filming location for contemporary TV series and commercials.

The park was created in 1967 when the Conejo Recreation and Park District (CRPD) acquired Mount Clef Ridge and Wildwood Canyon from the Janss Investment Company land developers. It was merged with Wildwood Mesa Park in 1987 and is now administrated and operated by the Conejo Open Space Conservation Agency (COSCA), which is a joint organization by the Conejo Recreation and Park District (CRPD) and the City of Thousand Oaks.

Restrictions were put in place for Paradise Falls during the COVID-19 pandemic due to crowded conditions in which people were unable to social distance and also the resulting litter and human waste that was left behind.

Features

The park offers recreational outdoor activities, including hiking, mountain biking, jogging, horseback riding, picnicking, educational tours, interpretive programs, camping, and wildlife viewing.

Some of the popular attractions in the park include the  cascade of Paradise Falls, as well as the Arroyo Conejo Creek and creek-bed, the large wooden teepee, the Nature Center and Indian Cave. The Lizard Rock formation is a serrate volcanic outcropping in the Mount Clef Ridge.

At Lizard Rock, Teepee Overlook, and similar higher elevation areas, there are panoramic views of the Conejo Valley.

Attractions

Special points of interest include:

 Arroyo Conejo: Creek, creekbed, and gorge.
 Paradise Falls: year-round 70-ft. cascade in a steep gorge.
 Little Falls: one of two year-round waterfalls.
 Lizard Rock: serrate volcanic outcropping resembling a lizard.
 Mount Clef Ridge: volcanic-rock outcropping and wildlife corridor. Featured in films such as Flaming Star, Dark Victory, Spartacus, Wuthering Heights, and others.
 Indian Cave
 Nature Center (Meadows Cave)
 Teepee Overlook: large wooden teepee on a knoll.
 Fort Wildwood: log fort located at the opening of the park near Avenida De Los Arboles and Lynn Road. The fort has long been removed and a trail marker put in its place.

Trails
The park is home to fourteen nature trails covering over 27 miles.

Among the most popular hiking trails are the 2.5 mile Mesa Trail Loop, 3 mile Lizard Rock Trail, 3 mile Moonridge Trail, 3 mile Paradise Falls Trail, 3 mile Indian Creek Loop, 4 mile Wildwood Park Loop, 6 mile Lower Butte Trail Loop, 6 mile Lynnmere Trail, 6.3 mile Santa Rosa Trail (going to the hills by California Lutheran University), 6.5 mile Santa Rosa Loop, and the 7 mile Hill Canyon Trail.

For the main park entrance, from the Lynn Road exit on the 101 Freeway (Ventura Freeway) and take Lynn Road northbound for 2.5 miles to Avenida de Los Arboles. Then turn left and continue for 0.9 miles to the end of the street at Big Sky Drive. There are numerous other trailheads, including: by 398 Briar Bluff Court, 2601 San Miguel Circle, 930 Lynnmere Drive, and 2629 Velarde Drive in Thousand Oaks; by 11121 Rocky High Road in Santa Rosa Valley; by 11160 Sumac Lane in Camarillo, as well as in Newbury Park on the west and Moorpark in Box Canyon.

Ecology
Wildwood Regional Park is recognized for its varied terrain, wildlife and two waterfalls. The terrain consists of large areas of volcanic rock outcroppings, the year-round Arroyo Conejo creek and its two waterfalls, oak woodlands of coast live oak and valley oak trees, creek-beds lined with California sycamore trees and cattails, several canyons, steep hills, and relatively flat grasslands.

The climate is Mediterranean, but oftentimes cooler than other areas in the Conejo Valley due to cool coastal breeze easily winding its way up through canyons and lower elevations.

The park's flora is extensive and more than 250 plant species have been recorded within the park. Habitats include: southern oak woodlands, riparian woodland, chaparral and coastal sage scrub, California grassland, and freshwater marsh.

Wildlife

The park is home to a wide variety of wildlife and is a wildlife corridor connecting the Santa Monica Mountains to the Santa Susana Mountains and other western Transverse Ranges. Its fauna includes 60 species of birds, 37 species of mammals, and 22 species of amphibians and reptiles.

It is home to various mammals, such as the plentiful mule deer, coyote, and bobcat; and occasionally for cougars and ring-tailed cats. Smaller mammal species include the grey fox, striped skunk and spotted skunk, California raccoon, Virginia opossum, Audubon's cottontail, long-tailed weasel, Botta's pocket gopher, California vole, western brush rabbit, and western gray squirrel.

The most common amphibians here are found along the Arroyo Conejo creekbed, and include the ensatina, slender salamander, western toad, American bullfrog, California toad, Pacific tree frog, and the California red-legged frog.

There are a variety of reptiles − including side-blotched lizards, southern alligator lizards and western fence lizards; the native western pond turtle and introduced/invasive crawdads; and numerous species of snakes, including southern Pacific rattlesnakes, San Diego gopher snakes, striped racers, California kingsnakes, common kingsnakes, ringneck snakes, and western aquatic garter snakes.

There are a variety of songbirds, wood-peckers, and raptors such as red-tail hawks, Cooper's hawks, owls, ravens, and falcons.

Mammals

Wildwood Regional Park is home to 37 species of mammals, including:

Reptiles and amphibians

Filmography

A nearby road, Flaming Star Avenue, is named after the film Flaming Star (1960) starring Elvis Presley, which was filmed in the area. The park is still occasionally used for filming. Some of the many films shot here include:

See also
 La Branca (Arroyo Conejo Nature Preserve)
 Mount Clef Ridge
 Hill Canyon
 Conejo Canyons Open Space

References

External links

 COSF.org—Conejo Open Space Foundation: official Wildwood Regional Park website

Parks in Ventura County, California
Regional parks in California
Conejo Valley
Simi Hills
Geography of Thousand Oaks, California
Moorpark, California
Movie ranches
Protected areas established in 1967
1967 establishments in California